John Gayle (September 11, 1792 – July 21, 1859) was the 7th Governor of Alabama, a United States representative from Alabama, a justice of the Supreme Court of Alabama and a United States district judge of the United States District Court for the Middle District of Alabama, the United States District Court for the Northern District of Alabama and the United States District Court for the Southern District of Alabama.

Education and career

Born on September 11, 1792, in Sumter County, South Carolina, Gayle pursued classical studies and graduated from South Carolina College (now the University of South Carolina) in 1813 and read law in 1818. He was President of the Clariosophic Society while at South Carolina College. He was admitted to the bar and entered private practice in St. Stephens, Alabama Territory (State of Alabama from December 14, 1819) starting in 1818. He was a member of the Legislative Council for Alabama Territory from 1818 to 1819. He was a solicitor for the First Judicial Circuit of Alabama from 1819 to 1821. He was a member of the Alabama House of Representatives from 1822 to 1823, and again from 1829 to 1830, serving as Speaker in 1829. He was a Judge of the Alabama Circuit Court for the Third Judicial Circuit from 1823 to 1825. He resumed private practice in Greene County, Alabama from 1826 to 1828. He was a justice of the Supreme Court of Alabama from 1828 to 1829. He was Governor of Alabama from 1831 to 1835. He again resumed private practice in Mobile, Alabama from 1835 to 1846. Gayle was mentioned in American Slavery As It Is, an abolitionist book published in 1839. He is given as an example of slavers who disregard marriages of enslaved African Americans. The book reprints a signed advertisement Gayle had placed in a newspaper seeking help capturing an escaped man and suggesting the fugitive could be heading to a neighboring county where the enslaved man's wife lived.

Notable state court case

During his service as a judge, Gayle presided over the Petition for Freedom of Cornelius Sinclair, a young African American child who had been kidnapped and sold into slavery in Tuscaloosa, Alabama.

Notable achievements as Governor

During Gayle's term as Governor of Alabama, the state bank was expanded, and the first railroad was completed in Alabama. The Bell Factory, the state's first textile mill, was incorporated in Madison County.

Congressional service

Gayle was elected as a Whig from Alabama's 1st congressional district to the United States House of Representatives of the 30th United States Congress, serving from March 4, 1847, to March 3, 1849. He was Chairman of the Committee on Private Land Claims for the 30th United States Congress.

Federal judicial service

Gayle was nominated by President Zachary Taylor on March 12, 1849, to a joint seat on the United States District Court for the Middle District of Alabama, the United States District Court for the Northern District of Alabama and the United States District Court for the Southern District of Alabama vacated by Judge William Crawford. He was confirmed by the United States Senate on March 13, 1849, and received his commission the same day. His service terminated on July 21, 1859, due to his death in Jacksonville, Alabama. He was interred in Magnolia Cemetery in Mobile.

Family

Gayle was married to Sarah Ann Haynsworth, formerly a resident of South Carolina, from June 11, 1819, until she died in 1835, due to lockjaw (tetanus). They had six children. In 1837, Gayle married Clarissa Stedman Peck at Gaston, Alabama. They had four children. Gayle died of ill health and natural causes on July 21, 1859, aged 66.

During his time on Alabama Supreme Court (1828–29), John Gayle constructed his family home in Greensboro, Alabama, then a part of Greene County, now part of Hale County. There Sarah gave birth to Amelia Gayle Gorgas. She was the wife of Gen. Josiah Gorgas, Chief of Ordnance of the Confederate States of America, mother of William Crawford Gorgas, 22nd United States Surgeon General who freed the Panama Canal Zone of yellow fever.

References

Sources
 

1792 births
1859 deaths
19th-century American judges
19th-century American politicians
Alabama state court judges
Democratic Party governors of Alabama
Judges of the United States District Court for the Northern District of Alabama
Judges of the United States District Court for the Middle District of Alabama
Judges of the United States District Court for the Southern District of Alabama
Democratic Party members of the Alabama House of Representatives
Members of the Alabama Territorial Legislature
Politicians from Mobile, Alabama
People from Sumter, South Carolina
Speakers of the Alabama House of Representatives
Justices of the Supreme Court of Alabama
United States federal judges admitted to the practice of law by reading law
United States federal judges appointed by Zachary Taylor
University of South Carolina alumni
Whig Party members of the United States House of Representatives from Alabama
Lawyers from Mobile, Alabama